Shatrughan Gautam is an Indian politician from the Bharatiya Janata Party. He was the member of the Rajasthan Legislative Assembly representing the Kekri Vidhan Sabha constituency of Rajasthan, starting from December 2013 till December 2018 
.

References 

Living people
Bharatiya Janata Party politicians from Rajasthan
Rajasthan MLAs 2013–2018
Year of birth missing (living people)